Vazgen is a given name and may refer to:

Vazgen I of Bucharest, born Levon Garabed Baljian (1908–1994), the Catholicos of All Armenians 1955–1994
Vazgen Azrojan (born 1977), retired Armenian ice dancer
Vazgen Manasyan (born 1958), Tajikistani professional football coach and a former player
Vazgen Manukyan (born 1946), the first Prime Minister of Armenia, from 1990 to 1991
Vazgen Muradian (1921–2018), Armenian born Armenian-American neo-classicist composer
Vazgen Safarian (born 1954), retired Iranian Armenian football player
Vazgen Safaryants (born 1984), Belarusian amateur boxer of Armenian origin
Vazgen Sargsyan (1959–1999), Armenian military commander and politician

See also
Vazgen Sargsyan House-Museum, a house-museum located in the Ararat village of Ararat Province, Armenia
Vazgen Sargsyan Republican Stadium also known as the Republican Stadium
Vazgen Sargsyan Military University under the Ministry of Defense of Armenia
Vagen (disambiguation)
Vazgestan

Armenian masculine given names